The 2016–17 Serie A season was the 83rd, and final season of the Serie A, the top level of ice hockey in Italy. 16 teams participated in the league, and Ritten Sport won the championship. Hockey Milano Rossoblu won the League Cup. After this season the Serie A was folded, and merged into multi-nation league called the Alps Hockey League.

Regular season

References

External links 
 Lega Italiana Hockey Ghiaccio website
 Elite Prospects

Ita
Serie A
Serie A (ice hockey) seasons